Fostoria is an unincorporated community and census-designated place (CDP) in Blair County, Pennsylvania, United States. It was first listed as a CDP prior to the 2020 census.

The CDP is in northern Blair County, in the eastern part of Antis Township. It is bordered to the east by the Little Juniata River and to the west by the Pittsburgh Line of the Norfolk Southern Railway.

Demographics

References 

Census-designated places in Blair County, Pennsylvania
Census-designated places in Pennsylvania